Glucocerebroside (also called glucosylceramide) is any of the cerebrosides in which the monosaccharide head group is glucose.

Clinical significance
In Gaucher disease, the enzyme glucocerebrosidase is nonfunctional and cannot break down glucocerebroside into glucose and ceramide in the lysosome.  Affected macrophages, called Gaucher cells, have a distinct appearance similar to "wrinkled tissue paper" under light microscopy, because the substrates build-up within the lysosome.

See also
 Glucosylceramide synthase
 Gauchers disease
 Glucocerebrosidase

References

External links

Glycolipids
Carbohydrates